R. Brindle Knowelden (27 June 1919 – 16 April 2010) was an English professional rugby league and association football (soccer) footballer who played in the 1940s and 1950s, and coached rugby league in the 1950s. He also played association football (soccer) for Morecambe and Liverpool (reserves).

Background
Bryn Knowelden was born in Barrow-in-Furness, Lancashire, England, he was a pupil of Dowdales School, after retiring from rugby league, he ran a newsagent in Cadishead, before retiring to Blackpool, and he died aged 90 in Blackpool, Lancashire, England.

Playing career

International honours
Bryn Knowelden won caps for England while at Barrow in 1944 against Wales, in 1945 against Wales, in 1947 against France, and won a cap for Great Britain while at Barrow in 1946 against New Zealand.

Championship final appearances
Bryn Knowelden played left-, i.e. number 4, in Warrington's 15–5 victory over Bradford Northern in the Championship Final during the 1947–48 season at Maine Road, Manchester on Saturday 8 May 1948, played in the 12–13 defeat by Huddersfield in the Championship Final during the 1948–49 season at Maine Road, Manchester on Saturday 14 May 1949, and played, and was captain in the 11–26 defeat by Workington Town in the Championship Final during the 1950–51 season at Maine Road, Manchester on Saturday 12 May 1951.

Challenge Cup Final appearances
Bryn Knowelden played , and scored a try in Warrington's 19–0 victory over Widnes in the 1949–50 Challenge Cup Final during the 1949–50 season at Wembley Stadium, London on Saturday 6 May 1950, in front of a crowd of 94,249.

County Cup Final appearances
Bryn Knowelden played  in Warrington's 5–28 defeat by Wigan in the 1950–51 Lancashire County Cup Final during the 1950–51 season at Station Road, Swinton on Saturday 4 November 1950.

Club career
During December 1947, Bryn Knowelden was transferred from Barrow to Warrington for £1,500 (based on increases in average earnings, this would be approximately £133,300 in 2013) he made his début for Warrington on Saturday 13 December 1947, and he played his last match for Warrington on Saturday 29 September 1951.

References

External links
(archived by web.archive.org) Barrow RL's great Britons
History of Warrington Rugby League Club 
Statistics at wolvesplayers.thisiswarrington.co.uk

1919 births
2010 deaths
Association footballers not categorized by position
Barrow Raiders players
England national rugby league team players
English footballers
English rugby league coaches
English rugby league players
Great Britain national rugby league team players
Hull Kingston Rovers coaches
Hull Kingston Rovers players
Liverpool F.C. players
Morecambe F.C. players
Rugby league centres
Rugby league five-eighths
Rugby league wingers
Rugby league players from Barrow-in-Furness
Warrington Wolves players